José Alí Meza Draegertt (born 17 April 1991) is a Venezuelan footballer who plays for Always Ready.

Career statistics

Club

Notes

Honours 

South African Premier Division
Winner (2): 2018-19 , 2019-20
Nedbank Cup
Winner : 2019-20
Telkom Knockout
Winner : 2019

References

1991 births
Living people
Venezuelan footballers
Venezuelan expatriate footballers
Association football forwards
A.C.C.D. Mineros de Guayana players
Deportivo Táchira F.C. players
C.D. Feirense players
Oriente Petrolero players
Mamelodi Sundowns F.C. players
Liga Portugal 2 players
South African Premier Division players
Venezuelan expatriate sportspeople in Portugal
Expatriate footballers in Portugal
Venezuelan expatriate sportspeople in Bolivia
Expatriate footballers in Bolivia
Venezuelan expatriate sportspeople in South Africa
Expatriate soccer players in South Africa
People from Ciudad Bolívar